The 2013 European Amateur Team Championship took place 9–13 July at Silkeborg Ry Golf Club in Silkeborg, located in the middle of the Jutlandic peninsula, Denmark. It was the 30th men's golf European Amateur Team Championship.

Venue 
The club was founded as Silkeborg Golf Club in 1965 and its first 18-hole course was fully developed in 1968. In early 2013 the club merged with Ry Golf Club and under the new name Silkeborg Ry Golf Club expanded to 54 holes.

Format 
The number of entering nation teams was, for the first time limited to 16. A second division, named European Men's Challenge Trophy, took place 10–13 July 2013 in the Czech Republic, giving the participating teams the opportunity to qualify for next year's championship. Belgium and Iceland finished first and second and qualified for the 2014 European Amateur Team Championship. The year after, the Challenge Trophy was renamed The European Amateur Team Championship Division 2.

Each team consisted of 6 players, playing two rounds of stroke-play over two days, counting the five best scores each day for each team.

There was no official award for the lowest individual score, but individual leaders were Rory McNamara, Ireland and James Ross, Scotland, each with a 1-under-par score of 143, one stroke ahead of Mads Søgaard, Denmark.

The eight best teams formed flight A, in knock-out match-play over the next three days. The teams were seeded based on their positions after the stroke play. The first placed team was drawn to play the quarter final against the eight placed team, the second against the seventh, the third against the sixth and the fourth against the fifth. Teams were allowed to use six players during the team matches, selecting four of them in the two morning foursome games and five players in to the afternoon single games. Teams knocked out after the quarter finals played one foursome game and four single games in each of their remaining matches. Games all square at the 18th hole were declared halved, if the team match was already decided.

The eight teams placed 9–16 in the qualification stroke-play formed flight B, to play similar knock-out play, with one foursome game and four single games in each match, to decide their final positions.

Teams 
16 nation teams contested the event, four less than at the previous event two years earlier. Each team consisted of six players.

Winners 
Leader of the opening 36-hole competition was team France, with a 15-over-par score of 735. Two-times champions Spain did not make it to the quarter finals, finishing 10th, despite future professional world number one, 18-year-old Jon Rahm, in the team, who finished tied fourth individually. Two-times-champions Sweden, finishing 13th in the qualifying round, did not make it to the quarter finals either.

Team England won the gold medal, earning their 11th title, beating neighbor nation Scotland in the final 4–2.

Team France, earned the bronze on third place, after beating the Netherlands 5–2 in the bronze match.

Norway and Wales, placed 14th and 16th, were moved to Division 2 for 2014. Finland, placed 15th, was qualified for the 2014 event as host nation.

Results 
Qualification round

Team standings

* Note: In the event of a tie the order was determined by the best total of the two non-counting scores of the two rounds.

Individual leaders

Note: There was no official award for the lowest individual score.

Flight A

Bracket

Final games

* Note: Game declared halved, since team match already decided.

Flight B

Bracket

Final standings

Sources:

See also 
 Eisenhower Trophy – biennial world amateur team golf championship for men organized by the International Golf Federation.
 European Ladies' Team Championship – European amateur team golf championship for women organised by the European Golf Association.

References

External links 
European Golf Association: Full results

European Amateur Team Championship
Golf tournaments in Denmark
European Amateur Team Championship
European Amateur Team Championship
European Amateur Team Championship